This is a list of painters from the Italian city of Milan.

A–M

 Filippo Abbiati (1640-1715)
 Agostino Aglio (1777-1857)
 Andrea-Salvatore Aglio (1736-1786)
 Federico Agnelli (1626-1702)
 Giovanni Agucchi (1570-1632)
 Giuseppe Amisani (1881-1941)
 Giuseppe Appiani (1740-1812)
 Carlo Bacchiocco
 Bartolomeo di Cassino (late 16th century)
 Giovanni Bellati (1745-1808)
 Ambrogio Bergognone (1452-1522)
 Cesare Bernazano (1504-15??)
 Giuseppe Bertini (1825-1898)
 Ambrogio Besozzi (1648-1706)
 Federico Bianchi (1635-1719)
 Isidoro Bianchi (1581-1662)
 Carlo Biffi (1605-1675)
 Francesco Biondo (1735-1805)
 Leonardo di Bisuccio (15th century)
 Giovanni Antonio Boltraffio (1466-1515)
 Giovanni Battista Bonacina (1620-1664)
 Benigno Bossi (1727-1800)
 Zanetto Bugatti (1439-1475)
 Guglielmo Caccia (1568-1625)
 Margherita Caffi (1650-1710)
 Antonio Caimi (1811-1878)
 Francesco Cairo (1607-1665)
 Carlo Cane (1618-1688)
 Caravaggio (1571-1610)
 Giovanni Battista Cerva (1514-1580)
 Carlo Cornara (1605-1673)
 Daniele Crespi (1598-1630)
 Giovanni Battista Crespi (1573-1632)
 Giovanni Stefano Danedi (1612-1690)
 Giovanni Battista Discepoli (1590-1654)
 Gaudenzio Ferrari (1474-1546)
 Giovanni Ambrogio Figino (1552-1608)
 Giovanni Ghisolfi (1623-1683)
 Gerolamo Giovenone (1489-1554)
 Domenico Induno (1815-1878)
 Paolo Landriani (1757-1839)
 Paolo Camillo Landriani (1559-1618)
 Bernardino Lanini (1511-1583)
 Andrea Lanzani (1641-1712)
 Stefano Maria Legnani (1660-1715)
 Giuseppe Levati (1739-1828)
 Vittoria Ligari (1713-1783)
 Gian Paolo Lomazzo (1538-1592)
 Emilio Longoni (1859-1932)
 Aurelio Luini (1529-1593)
 Bernardino Luini (1474-1532)
 Cesare Magni (1494-1533)
 Marco d'Oggiono (1469-1539)
 Pier Francesco Mazzucchelli (1573-1626)
 Giuseppe Meda (1533-1599)

N–Z

 Carlo Francesco Nuvolone (c. 1609 - c. 1662)
 Panfilo Nuvolone (1580-1651)
 Cesare Poggi (1803-1859)
 Ferdinando Porta (1687-1763)
 Giovanni Battista Pozzi (1662-1730)
 Ranunzio Prata
 Constantino Prinetti (1830-1855)
 Ercole Procaccini the Younger (1605-1675)
 Ercole Procaccini the Elder (1519-1595)
 Camillo Procaccini (1561-1629)
 Carlo Antonio Procaccini (1554-1630)
 Giulio Cesare Procaccini (1573-1625)
 Bernardo Racchetti (1639-1702)
 Luigi Riccardi (1808-1877)
 Andrea Solari (1459-1523)
 Jacopo Tunicelli (1784-1825)
 Agustino Da Vaprio (15th century)
 Constantino Vaprio (active 1453-1482)
 Tanzio da Varallo (1575-1633)
 Francesco Vico (17th century)

See also

 List of Italian painters
 List of Milanese people

References

Painters
Milan
Milan
Painters